Sopris National Forest was established by the U.S. Forest Service in Colorado on April 26, 1909, with .  On August 7, 1920, the entire forest was transferred to Holy Cross National Forest and the name was discontinued. The lands are presently included in White River National Forest.

References

External links
Forest History Society
Forest History Society:Listing of the National Forests of the United States Text from Davis, Richard C., ed. Encyclopedia of American Forest and Conservation History. New York: Macmillan Publishing Company for the Forest History Society, 1983. Vol. II, pp. 743-788.

Former National Forests of Colorado